Darenjan-e Lor (also Romanized as Dārenjān-e Lor and Dārenjān Lor; also known as Darenjan and Dārenjānlū) is a village in Khvajehei Rural District, Meymand District, Firuzabad County, Fars Province, Iran. At the 2006 census, its population was 315, in 64 families.

References 

Populated places in Firuzabad County